For the mountain pass between Chile and Argentina, see Pampa Alta Pass (Puesto Viejo).

Pampa Alta is a town and municipality in Santa Cruz Province in southern Argentina.

References

Populated places in Santa Cruz Province, Argentina